William Henry "Dooee" Tanner (2 March 1870 –  29 December 1938) was a rugby union player who represented Australia.

Tanner, a prop and hooker, was born in England and moved to Queensland as a child.  He claimed two international rugby caps for Australia. His Test debut was against Great Britain at Sydney on 24 June 1899, the inaugural rugby Test match played by an Australian national representative side.

Published references
 Collection (1995) Gordon Bray presents The Spirit of Rugby, Harper Collins Publishers Sydney
 Howell, Max (2005) Born to Lead - Wallaby Test Captains, Celebrity Books, Auckland NZ

Footnotes

Australian rugby union players
Australia international rugby union players
1938 deaths
1870 births
Rugby union props
Rugby union hookers
Rugby union players from London